Philip Traherne, or Traheron (9 August 1635 in Lugwardine – 1686 in St. Nicholas, Hereford) was an English diplomat, author of books.

He was son of Thomas Traherne (1603–1644) and Mary. He was English Chaplain at Smyrna in 1669–1674. He possessed minuscule 71, a Greek manuscript of the four Gospels, and brought it to England. Traherne collated text of the manuscript, and in 1679, presented it to Lambeth Palace along with its collation.

Works 
 The soul's communion with her saviour. Or, The history of our Lord Jesus Christ, written by the four evangelists digested into devotional meditations (1685)

References

Further reading 
 J. B. Pearson, A biographical sketch of the chaplains to the Levant Company 1611-1706 (Cambridge 1883), pp. 32–33.

1635 births
1686 deaths
British chaplains
English book and manuscript collectors